Mr Gay Sweden is a beauty pageant for gay Swedes. The contest is held at Berns in Berzelii Park, in Stockholm, Sweden. It was created by the Swedish gay magazine and Internet community Qruiser in 1999. Since 2005, the winner represents the country at the Mr Gay Europe pageant. The winner is traditionally announced by SMS-voting after hot picks by a panel of celebrity judges.

Past winners
 2018 – cancelled
 2017 – Samuel Bälter
 2015 – 2016 (ingen tävling)
 2014 – Anton Ljungberg
 2013 – Jack Johansson
 2012 – Fritiof Ingelhammar (plus QX readers' favourite: Jakob Prim)
 2011 – Kristian Sääf
 2010 – Simon Forsberg
 2009 – Christo Willesen
 2008 – Mirza "Mirre"
 2007 – Joachim Brattfjord Corneliusson
 2006 – Henrik Lindholm
 2005 – Erik Berger
 2004 – Jörgen Tenor
 2003 – Nicklas Ottosson
 2002 – Cato Helleren
 2001 – Alexander Ervik
 2000 – Jonas Hedqvist
 1999 – Jesper Wallin

External links
 Qruiser

Sources

Culture in Stockholm
LGBT events in Sweden
Beauty pageants in Sweden
Recurring events established in 1999
1999 establishments in Sweden
LGBT beauty pageants
Male beauty pageants
Swedish awards
Mr Gay World